Rockford Forest Citys (officially the Forest City Club), from Rockford, Illinois was one of the first professional baseball clubs. They are not to be confused with the Cleveland Forest Citys, who played in the same league.

Origins
From 1868 to 1870, future Hall of Famer Albert Spalding and infielder Ross Barnes starred for Rockford while the club was still considered an 'amateur' team. In reality, the Forest Citys were one of the first ball clubs to pay players. Rockford played their home games at the Agricultural Society Fair Grounds.

1871 season

Rockford finished in last place with 4 wins and 21 losses, 15½ games behind the champion Philadelphia Athletics. Their poor record was partially because player-manager Scott Hastings was found to have violated the "60 day rule" implemented by the league—if a player switched teams during the season, the team had to bench him for 60 days before he could play. Hastings had jumped from an independent team (the Lone Star club of New Orleans) to the Forest Citys in the spring and immediately begun playing for Rockford. This complaint was brought before the league, and the Forest Citys were forced to forfeit four games they had won, including a game played on June 15, just a day before Hastings would have been eligible to appear. Since two of the forfeits came against the first-place Athletics, who finished two games in front of both the Boston Red Stockings and the Chicago White Stockings, Rockford's decision to play Hastings had an outsize impact on the 1871 pennant race.

The star of the Forest Citys was Cap Anson, who hit .325 in 1871 and would go on to become the player-manager of the Chicago White Stockings for over 20 seasons. Anson was inducted into the Hall of Fame in 1939.

Folding
Rockford had faced significant financial hardship during 1871, including travel costs, and did not make a profit. Additionally, star Anson decided to accept a $1,250 contract offer from Philadelphia for the  season. So, the club folded after its first and only season.

References

Wright, Marshall (2000). The National Association of Base Ball Players, 1857–1870. Jefferson, North Carolina: McFarland & Co.

External links

Rockford Forest Citys 1871 season at Baseball-Reference.com

Professional baseball teams in Illinois
National Association of Base Ball Players teams
Defunct National Association baseball teams
Sports clubs disestablished in 1871
Forest Citys
Defunct baseball teams in Illinois
1871 disestablishments in Illinois
Baseball teams disestablished in 1871
Baseball teams established in 1871